Patrick de Suarez d'Aulan   (born 1971, Paris)) is an aristocrat, winemaker, and businessman.

Career
In 1999 de Suarez d'Aulan co-founded Alta Vista winery in Argentina. In 2001, he was one of the first producers in Argentina to produce single-vineyard Malbec grape wines coming from specific old vines' terroirs of Mendoza.

In 1999, his family founded Chateau Dereszla winery in Tokay in Hungary.

Also in 1999, d'Aulan bought the Château Sansonnet estate in Saint-Émilion, France, for which the classification of Saint-Émilion wine had dropped from Grand Cru Classé to Grand Cru in 1996. In 2008, wine critic Robert Parker praised d'Aulan's "talented" development of the Château Sansonnet in the seventh edition of his Wine Buyer's Guide.

In 2010, he was one of the few non-Hungarian citizens to be awarded the Golden Cross of the Order of Merit of the Republic of Hungary by the President of Hungary, for his dedication to the region and wines of Tokay.

In 2016, Alta Vista winery was one of the nominees for "New World Winery of the Year" at Wine Enthusiast magazine's annual Wine Star Award.

References

 Francois d'Aulan " Un fil dans le Tapis, histoire des Suarez d'Aulan ", editions Karthala, Juin 2009,

External links
 :fr:Château d'Aulan
 https://books.google.com/books?id=dKc1AAAAMAAJ&pg=PA83&lpg=PA83&dq=Francois+de+Suarez+d%27Aulan&source=bl&ots=9Z7Sg4TM11&sig=ACfU3U2R-S1kO9Lf7yviBvRt-8v5JJ_2Zw&hl=en&sa=X&ved=2ahUKEwiuuuT0qd3pAhUSnOAKHbgaC5s4ChDoATAHegQIBBAB#v=onepage&q=Francois%20de%20Suarez%20d'Aulan&f=false

French businesspeople
French winemakers
Recipients of the Order of Merit of the Republic of Hungary
1971 births
Living people